Sonarpur Junction railway station is a Kolkata Suburban Railway Junction station on the main line with an approximate  distance from the Sealdah railway station. It is under the jurisdiction of the Eastern Railway zone of Indian Railways. Sonarpur Junction railway station is one of the busiest railway stations in the Sealdah railway division. More than 115 pairs of EMU local trains pass through the railway station on a daily basis. In terms of UTS revenue earning, it is 3rd in Sealdah division after Sealdah and Krisnanagar City Jn. It is situated in South 24 Parganas district in the Indian state of West Bengal. Sonarpur Junction railway station serves Rajpur Sonarpur and the surrounding areas.

Geography

History

Electrification

Station complex
The platform is well sheltered. The station possesses many facilities including water and sanitation. It is well connected to the SH-1. There is a proper approach road to this station.

References

Railway junction stations in West Bengal
Railway stations in South 24 Parganas district
Sealdah railway division
Kolkata Suburban Railway stations
Railway stations opened in 1862
1862 establishments in India
1862 establishments in the British Empire